Ronchin is a commune in the Nord department in northern France (Hauts-de-France). It is part of the European Metropolis of Lille.

Population

Heraldry

See also
Communes of the Nord department

References

Communes of Nord (French department)
French Flanders